Stanislav Vladimirovich Kankurov (born 20 December 1985) is a Kazakh politician who is serving as a member of the Almaty City Mäslihat since 2016 and its Secretary from 15 January 2021. As a member of the Nur Otan, Kankurov occupied several posts in the party's branch in Almaty and was its First Deputy Chairman from October 2018 to January 2021.

Biography

Early life and education 
Born in the village of Kaskelen about 20 km away from Almaty, Kankurov studied at the Moscow State University where he earned his degree in economics and then graduated from D. Kunaev University specializing in law. At the Central Asian University, Kankurov studied computer science and software.

Career 
Kankurov began his career in 2005 as a specialist and chief specialist of Technical Inventory of Property LLP then as the company's director of technical Inventory. From 2006, he worked at the JSC PSTK Bitelecom. While working there, he served as Vice President of the Kazakhstan-2030 Support for the Program of the President of the Republic of Kazakhstan from 2010. In 2011, Kankurov became the First Deputy Chairman of the Nur Otan Bostandyq District Branch where he served until 2013, when he was appointed as Deputy Chairman of the Nur Otan Almaty City Branch, eventually becoming the First Deputy Chairman on 4 October 2018. Kankurov served the post until 20 January 2021.

Political career 

In March 2016, Kankurov was elected as a member of the 6th Almaty City Mäslihat from the 19th Bostandyq District constituency. From there, he served as member of the Mäslihat Standing Committee on Construction and Land Relations. At the 2021 Almaty City Mäslihat elections, Kankurov was included in the Nur Otan party-list and participated in the televised debates between the party's representatives of the city branch. After being re-elected, he was unanimously chosen to be Secretary of the City Mäslihat at the age 35, becoming the youngest person to hold such post.

References 

Living people
1985 births
People from Almaty Region
Moscow State University alumni
Nur Otan politicians
Kazakhstani people of Russian descent